Abergavenny was an ancient hundred of Monmouthshire.

It was situated in the northern part of the county, bounded on the north by Herefordshire; on the east by the hundreds of Skenfrith, Raglan, and Usk; on the south by Wentloog hundred; and on the west by Wentloog and Brecknockshire.

It contained the following ancient parishes:

 Abergavenny
 Abersychan
 Abertillery
 Crucornau Fawr
 Cwmyoy
 Goetre Fawr
 Llanarth
 Llanfoist
 Llanddewi Rhydderch
 Llandewi Skirrid
 Llantilio Pertholey
 Llanellen
 Llanfable
 Llanfair Kilgeddin
 Llanfferrin
 Llanfihangel Crucorney
 Llangatwg Dyffryn Wysg
 Llangattock-Lingoed
 Llanhilleth
 Llanover
 Llansaintffraid
 Llanwenarth
 Lloyndu hamlet
 Mamhilad
 Oldcastle
 Trevethin

The administration of the area is now divided between the local authorities of Monmouthshire, Torfaen and Blaenau Gwent.  Part is within the area of the Brecon Beacons National Park.

References

External links
Abergavenny Hundred on a Vision of Britain

Abergavenny